The 2021 Physical Disability Rugby League World Cup, also known as the 2021 PDRL World Cup, was the first world cup for physical disability rugby league. The tournament was held from 23 October to 30 October 2022 in Warrington, England, alongside the main tournaments of the 2021 Rugby League World Cup. The tournament was originally planned as part of the 2021 Festival of World Cups, which was due to take place in the summer of 2021, but was rescheduled following the postponement of the festival. England defeated New Zealand 42–10 in the final to become the first world champions. Third place went to Wales who defeated Australia 32–18 in a play-off.

Teams
Four teams competed in the tournament: Australia, England, New Zealand and Wales. Teams from Ireland and Scotland had also been planning to take part.

Squads

Australia
Australia head coach: B. Pellegrino

 Kane Ridgley (Gold Coast Titans)
 Jonathan Smith (South Sydney Rabbitohs)
 Bryce Crane (Sydney Roosters)
 Karel Dekker (Gold Coast Titans)
 Kyle Lloyd (Newtown Jets)
 Dean Clark (Gold Coast Titans)
 Hudson Wicks (Gold Coast Titans)
 Stephen Hendry (Gold Coast Titans)
 Harry Rodgers (Gold Coast Titans)
 Adam Hills (Warrington Wolves)
 Dylan Jobson (Gold Coast Titans)
 Richard Muff (Gold Coast Titans)
 Peter Mitchell (South Sydney Rabbitohs)
 George Tonna (South Sydney Rabbitohs)
 Edward Sharp (Newtown Jets)
 Rylan Gaudron (South Sydney Rabbitohs)
 Geoff Clarke (South Sydney Rabbitohs)
 Fady Taiba (Wests Tigers)
 Rylee Lowe (Sydney Roosters)
 Michael Baker (Gold Coast Titans)

source:

England
England head coach: Shaun Briscoe

 Darren Dean (Wakefield Trinity)
 Ben Seward (Wigan Warriors)
 Scott Gobin (Leeds Rhinos)
 Callum Parkinson (Wakefield Trinity)
 Nicholas Leigh (Leeds Rhinos)
 Adam Fleming (Wakefield Trinity)
 Sam Zellar (Leeds Rhinos)
 Adam Morris (Warrington Wolves)
 Jamie Barnett (Warrington Wolves)
 Ben Nicholson (Wakefield Trinity)
 Peter Clarke (Leeds Rhinos)
 Harvey Redmonds (Leeds Rhinos)
 Tommy Pouncey (Leeds Rhinos)
 Tony Seward (Warrington Wolves)
 Connor Lynes (Castlefield Tigers)
 Nick Horner (Leeds Rhinos)
 Mark Gummerson (Castlefield Tigers)
 Mike Addison (Warrington Wolves)
 Nick Kennedy (Castlefield Tigers)
 John Clements (Wakefield Trinity)

source:

New Zealand
New Zealand head coach: Ray Greaves

 Harley Roach
 Garry Kingi
 Jeremy Hendrix Harris
 Max Walsh
 Shane Culling
 Timothy Ragg
 Kent Stroobant
 Jed Stone
 Shane Ratahi
 Mal Davis
 Matthew Williams
 Michael Kulene
 Daley Manu
 Che Fornusek
 Philip Milne
 Roko Nailolo
 Matthew Slade
 Delta Taeauga

source:

Wales
Wales head coach: Craig Fisher

 Leif Thobroe (Salford Red Devils PDRL)
 Robert Carpenter (Cardiff Chiefs MARU)
 Nick Harris (Port Talbot Panthers MARU)
 Gareth Sullivan (Salford Red Devils PDRL)
 Tyma Hughes (Salford Red Devils PDRL)
 Isaac Pickett (Leeds Rhinos PDRL)
 Morgan Jones (Salford Red Devils PDRL)
 Daniel Shaw (Pembrokeshire Vikings MARU)
 Connor Rice (Salford Red Devils PDRL)
 Stewart Newton (Salford Red Devils PDRL)
 Justin Martin (Port Talbot Panthers MARU)
 Dylan Hughes (Leeds Rhinos PDRL)
 Ben Lewis (Salford Red Devils PDRL)
 Paul Jones (Salford Red Devils PDRL)
 Chris Young (Leeds Rhinos PDRL)
 Chris Spriggs (Llanelli Warriors MARU)

source:

Venues

The tournament took place in Warrington with all of the group stage matches and the third-place play-off at Victoria Park and the final being held at the Halliwell Jones Stadium.

Format
On 29 July 2022 the draw was made for the match schedule during an episode of The Last Leg on which the main presenter, Adam Hills, announced his intention to be part of the Australian squad. The four teams competed in a round-robin group stage with the top two going on to the final and the other teams playing to determine the third and fourth places.

Wales Technical Infringement
During halftime of the 28 October Wales v Australia game, it was announced that during the  Wales v New Zealand game (23 October), Wales had committed an unintended technical breach. This breach was in regard to the ability classification level of the players onfield; in PDRL, ability is divided into three categories, and denoted by specific sock colours. There can be only a specific number of players per sock colour on the field at a time. The Welsh coach attributed the infraction of this rule to "miscommunications across the board", and as a result, Wales competed in the third place playoffs rather than the final competition.

Group stage

Knockout stage

Broadcasting

Notes

References

External links
PDRL WORLD CUP: Wales Rugby League

2021 Rugby League World Cup
Rugby League World Cup
Physical Disability Rugby League
Rugby League World Cup